Tacca maculata is a plant in the Dioscoreaceae family, native to Western Australia, the Northern Territory, Fiji and Samoa

It was first described by Berthold Carl Seemann in 1866.

Description 
Tacca maculata has few leaves on petioles up to 1.9 m long, and (usually greater than 1 m long).  The leaf lamina start  trisected but then become irregularly dissected.  The scape of the inflorescence is up to 2 m long. There are three or four involucral bracts and they are lanceolate to ovate.  There are 20 to 40 flowers on pedicels  which are up to 5 cm long.  The sepals and petals are similar, and green on the outside, maroon on the inside. The style is about 2 mm long and has three glandular patches at the base. The fruit  is rounded and topped with a persistent perianth.

Habitat 
T. maculata usually grows in well-drained lateritic soils.

References

External links
Tacca maculata occurrence data from the Australasian Virtual Herbarium

Tacca maculata

Flora of Western Australia
Flora of the Northern Territory
Flora of Fiji
Flora of Samoa
Taxa named by Berthold Carl Seemann
Plants described in 1866